All Saints’ Church, Youlgreave is a Grade I listed parish church in the Church of England in Youlgreave, Derbyshire.

History
The church dates from the late 12th century, with 14th-, 15th- and 16th-century elements. It was restored between 1869 and 1870 by Richard Norman Shaw. The roofs were completed renewed. A new east window was inserted in the chancel, designed by the Birmingham Pre-Raphaelite artist Edward Burne-Jones. The floor of the chancel was raised and laid with encaustic tiles interspersed with bands of stone. The rest of the church was paved with tiles and new heating was installed. The organ was moved to the south aisle, and the old pews were replaced with oak seating. The restoration cost £5,100.

Memorials

Rogerus Rooe (d. 1613)
Robert and Julia Gilbert
Carolius Greaves (d. 1729)
Thomas Cockayne (d. 1488)

Parish status
The church is in a joint parish with
Holy Trinity Church, Stanton-in-Peak
St Michael's Church, Birchover
St Michael and All Angels’ Church, Middleton-by-Youlgreave

Organ
The church contains an organ by Kirtland and Jardine. The original instrument, comprising two manuals and 16 stops was opened on 15 April 1863. It was renovated in 1873 by Jardine of Manchester. A specification of the organ can be found on the National Pipe Organ Register.

See also
Grade I listed churches in Derbyshire
Grade I listed buildings in Derbyshire
Listed buildings in Youlgreave

References

Church of England church buildings in Derbyshire
Grade I listed churches in Derbyshire